The 1939–40 Illinois Fighting Illini men's ice hockey season was the 3rd season of play for the program.

Season
For the team's third season, a man who knew ice hockey was brought in to head the team. Vic Heyliger, a Michigan alum, began making his mark on the team and an exhibition game in December gave a preview of how things were going to shake out for the Illini. The Freshman squad defeated the varsity team 13–5. While this was good news in some respect, as the freshman team provided hope for the team improving as soon as 1940, the varsity squad couldn't use any of those players this season. If they were so thoroughly dominated by their own 1st-year players, how would the varsity team fare in the rest of their season?

The question was answered rather quickly when Illinois welcomed Minnesota for their season-opening series and were promptly shelled by the powerhouse Gophers. Despite the uneven scores, John Gillan performed admirably in net, stopping 92 shots in two games. A week later, Illinois was in Ann Arbor and struggled to score, earning 1 goal in each of their two games against the Wolverines, but they were able to allow far fewer goals to the Maize and Blue.

The team took a few weeks off for examinations and then returned in Early February with a dominating performance over Saint Louis. Despite missing coach Heyliger to illness two players (Stewart and Mettler) to ineligibility, the team won their first game of the season 11–0. Joe Lotzer set a program record with 7 points in the game (3 goals, 4 assists). The good feelings didn't last long, however, as Illinois travelled to meet undefeated Minnesota in Minneapolis the following weekend and were shelled again in both games. 

Heyliger returned after the losses to Minnesota and took the team down to St. Louis for the rematch with the Billikens club team. Despite poor ice the team won 3–0 and then travelled north for their first ever meeting with Michigan Tech. Illinois faced the Huskies in four consecutive games, the first two being on the road, and lost all four matches. While the Illini weren't as outclassed as they were against the Gophers, the team still had trouble scoring and could only notch more than 1 goal in their final meeting. The team ended its season with a home series against Michigan and, after getting shut down in the first game, the team roared back with a tremendous effort. The Illini were finally able to finish their scoring chances and fired three goals into the net while John Gillan shut the door on the Wolverines. The win was not only the first for Illinois against a Big Ten team, but their first against any varsity squad. 

James Stables served as team manager.

Roster

Standings

Schedule and results

|-
!colspan=12 style=";" | Regular Season

† Michigan Tech archives list the games as being played in Champaign.‡ Saint Louis' program was a club team at the time.

References

Illinois Fighting Illini men's ice hockey seasons
Illinois
Illinois
Illinois
Illinois